Kawleikgyin is a 1959 Burmese black-and-white drama film, directed by Chin Sein starring Kawleikgyin Ne Win and Myint Myint Khin.

Cast
Kawleikgyin Ne Win as Ko Thein Pe
Myint Myint Khin as Ma Aye Sein

References

1959 films
1950s Burmese-language films
Films shot in Myanmar
Burmese black-and-white films
1959 drama films
Burmese drama films